Robert 'Rob' Hume is an English ornithologist, author and journalist specialising in avian and natural history subjects. From Spring 1989 (vol. 12 no. 5), until Summer 2009 (vol. 22 no. 6), he was editor of the RSPB's award-winning Birds magazine, having previously edited the young people's award-winning version, Bird Life, at the RSPB's headquarters, The Lodge.

Hume did his early birdwatching at Chasewater, Staffordshire, and was a member of the West Midland Bird Club. He spent several years studying at Swansea University, during which time he birdwatched regularly at Blackpill and on the Gower Peninsula.

He is a past member (and the fifth chairman) of the British Birds Rarities Committee; and a past member of the editorial board of British Birds magazine, but resigned both posts in 1997.  His autobiography, Life With Birds, was published in September 2005.

His drawings of birds often appeared in West Midland Bird Club reports and a number of books and journals.

He has led wildlife holidays in various European countries, Israel and Africa and has birdwatched widely in Europe, in India and Sri Lanka, Australia, the Caribbean and North America.

Bibliography

Britain's Birds: an identification guide to the birds of Britain and Ireland (Princeton up/WildGuides), 2016
 British Birds A Pocket Guide (Princeton UP/WildGuides), 2019
RSPB What's That Bird? (RSPB/Dorling Kindersley), 2012
The Observer's Book of Birds (Penguin), 1987
An Afternoon Out, 2019
The Adventures of Riggle Tiggle Spider, 2019
Father Christmas, the early years, 2019
A Birdwatcher's Miscellany, Blandford Press, 1984 
A Year of Bird Life, RSPB, 1985 
Birds of Britain, AA Publishing, 1988 
Birds by Character – Britain & Europe: A Fieldguide to Jizz, Macmillan, 1990 
Owls of the World Dragon's World, 1991 
Focus on Birdwatching Heinemann, 1992 
Discovering Birds, A & C Black, 1993 
The Common Tern, Hamlyn, 1993 
Seabirds (Hamlyn Bird Behaviour Guides) Hamlyn, 1993 (with illustrations by Bruce Pearson) 
Collins Gem Photoguide Birdwatching, Collins, 1995, 
The Shell Easy Bird Guide, (illustrated by Peter Hayman) Macmillan 1997, 
 2002 edition 
The EBCC Atlas of European Breeding Birds, T & A D Poyser, 1997  (contributor)
Birds: An Artist's View, Courage Books, 1998, 
Macmillan Bird Guide, Macmillan, 1998 
RSPB Birds of Britain and Europe, Dorling Kindersley, 2002 
RSPB Complete Birds of Britain and Europe, Dorling Kindersley, 2002, 
RSPB Complete Birds of Britain and Europe (revised and updated), Dorling Kindersley, 2007,  (includes CD of birdsong)
RSPB Birdwatching, Dorling Kindersley, 2003, 
English Birds and Green Places: Selected Writings: A Selection from the Writings of W.H. Hudson (Introduction), Weidenfeld & Nicolson, 2004, 
Rob Hume, Guilhem Lesaffre and Marc Duquet, 2004, Larousse  
Life With Birds (autobiography), David & Charles, 2005,

References

External links

English nature writers
English male journalists
English ornithologists
English magazine editors
People from Staffordshire
Year of birth missing (living people)
Living people
British bird artists
Royal Society for the Protection of Birds people
English autobiographers